Gianfranco Cuttica di Revigliasco (born 30 June 1957 in Turin) is an Italian professor and politician.

He is a member of Lega Nord and served as Mayor of Alessandria from 27 June 2017 to 28 June 2022.

See also
2017 Italian local elections
2022 Italian local elections
List of mayors of Alessandria

References

External links
 
 

1957 births
Living people
Mayors of Alessandria
People from Alessandria
Lega Nord politicians